Portrait of Iseppo da Porto and his son Adriano is a c.1555 oil-on-canvas painting by Paolo Veronese, now in the Contini Bonacossi collection, on long-term loan to the Uffizi in Florence. Veronese also decorated Porto's Palazzo Porto in Vicenza, designed by Andrea Palladio and completed in 1552. 

It is a pendant to a portrait of Iseppo's wife Livia or Lucia Thien, who he married in 1545, and one of their daughters. It was acquired in Paris from the Sedelmeyer collection by Alessandro Contini Bonacossi, though its female pendant was by then in a private collection in Vicenza, from which it later passed to the Walters Art Museum in Baltimore.

Additional images

References

Paintings in the collection of the Uffizi
Porto
1555 paintings
16th-century portraits
Paintings of children
Portraits of men